Laxminrusingha Temple is a Hindu Temple dedicated to Lord Nrusingha (Avatar of lord Vishnu). It is located at Purbakachha village (Near Bahugram) in Salipur area of Cuttack district in Odisha, India.

Location
It can be reached by Cuttack-Salipur, Cuttack-Nichintakoili buses and Tata Magic or local automobiles. The nearest railway station is Jagatpur Railway station ( away) and Cuttack Junction railway station ( away) and the nearest Airport is Biju Patnaik Airport, Bhubaneswar ( away).

References 

Hindu temples in Cuttack
Vishnu temples
Hindu temples in Odisha